Jody Azzouni (born Jawad Azzouni, 1954) is an American philosopher, poet, and writer. He currently is Professor of Philosophy at Tufts University.

Education
He received his bachelor's degree and master's degree from New York University and his PhD from the City University of New York.

Philosophical work
Azzouni is currently working on the philosophy of mathematics (he holds a degree in mathematics), science, logic, language and in areas of metaphysics, epistemology, and aesthetics. He acknowledges a debt to Willard Van Orman Quine. Azzouni is of the nominalist school of thought and has centered much of his philosophical efforts around defending nominalism.

Books
 Metaphysical Myths, Mathematical Practice: The Ontology and Epistemology of the Exact Sciences Cambridge University Press, 1994.
 Knowledge and Reference in Empirical Science Routledge,  2000.
 Deflating Existential Consequence: A Case for Nominalism Oxford University Press 2004 
Reviews, Bulletin of Symbolic Logic, 10:4,Dec. 2004, p. 573-577; Philosophia Mathematica, 2009. 
 Tracking Reason: Proof, Consequence and Truth. Oxford University Press, 2005.
 Talking About Nothing: Numbers, Hallucinations and Fictions. Oxford University Press, 2010.
 Semantic perception : how the illusion of a common language arises and persists. Oxford University Press, 2013. 
Review, Mind, 2016 link
Ontology without Borders. Oxford University Press, 2017.
Review,  Notre Dame Philosophical Reviews ejournal link
The Rule-Following Paradox and its Implications for Metaphysics. Synthese Library Book. 2017 
Attributing Knowledge: What It Means to Know Something. Oxford University Press, 2020.

Poetry collections 
Azzouni has published two collections of poetry with The Poets Press.

 The Lust for Blueprints, 1999 (rev. 2001)
 Hereafter Landscapes, 2010 (rev. 2019)

External links
 Jody Azzouni's personal website
 Faculty profile page

1954 births
Living people
Philosophers from Massachusetts
Philosophers of language
Philosophers of mathematics
American male poets
American poets
American short story writers
New York University alumni
Tufts University faculty
American male short story writers
American male non-fiction writers
Metaphysicians
Epistemologists